Marco Antonio Anariba Zelaya (born 18 February 1968) is a retired Honduran football player who made his name with the national team in the early 1990s.

Club career
Nicknamed Maco, Anariba made his debut for Real España in 1985 and spent 11 years with them. He scored 2 goals for the club in a 1991 CONCACAF Champions' Cup game against Belizean outfit Acros Verdes. He also played for Honduran clubs Motagua for whom he scored 3 goals and Universidad.

In 1990, Anariba was set to join Mexican side Santos Laguna but newly appointed Honduran coach "Chelato Uclés" signed compatriot Tomás Róchez instead to join a team including Eugenio Dolmo Flores and Luis "Gavilán" Cálix.

He retired at 30.

International career
A left-sided defender, Anariba made his debut for Honduras in a May 1991 UNCAF Nations Cup match against Panama and has earned a total of 25 caps, scoring 3 goals. He has represented his country in 10 FIFA World Cup qualification matches and played at the 1991 and 1993 UNCAF Nations Cups as well as at the 1991 CONCACAF Gold Cup.

His final international was a May 1993 FIFA World Cup qualification match against El Salvador.

International goals
Scores and results list Honduras' goal tally first.

Personal life
Anariba is married to Waldina, who is a lawyer, and lives in El Progreso where he runs a football school. In summer 2010, he got injured in a veteran league match and after he was treated by a doctor he suffered from thrombosis. His health deteriorated due to the medical malpractice and was bedridden for 30 days, the blood clots almost cost him his left leg. Real España later played a match to raise funds to cover his medical costs.

His brother Juan Manuel also played for Real España.

Honours and awards

Club
C.D. Real Espana
Liga Profesional de Honduras (3):  1988–89, 1990–91, 1993–94
Honduran Cup: (1): 1992

Country
Honduras
Copa Centroamericana (1): 1993,

References

External links

 Marco Anariba: “Estoy resentido con Chelato” (Interview and profile) - Diez 

1968 births
Living people
People from Yoro Department
Association football defenders
Honduran footballers
Honduras international footballers
1991 CONCACAF Gold Cup players
Real C.D. España players
F.C. Motagua players
Liga Nacional de Fútbol Profesional de Honduras players